General Henry Renny  (1815–1900) was a British Army officer who was the 24th General Officer Commanding, Ceylon.

He was appointed General Officer Commanding, Ceylon in 1869 and succeeded by John Alfred Street in 1874.

Career
Born 9 September 1815, Henry Renny was the second surviving son of Alexander Renny-Tailyour of Borrowfield and Elizabeth Bannerman Ramsay. He entered the army as Ensign in 1833. He was promoted to Lieutenant in 1835, Captain in 1844, Lieutenant-Colonel in 1853, Colonel in 1854, Major-General in 1867, Lieutenant-General in 1874, and General in 1877. 

He commanded the 81st Regiment throughout Indian Rebellion of 1857. For this service and others performed by the 81st Regiment, he was made a Companion of the Star of India (C.S.I.), and the 1857 Medal. He commanded the 1st Brigade in the Sittana Expedition of May 1858, under Sir Sydney Cotton, obtaining medal with clasp.

In 1875, he was given the colonelcy of the 35th (Royal Sussex) Regiment of Foot, transferring in 1879 back to the 81st Regiment of Foot (Loyal Lincoln Volunteers) until their amalgamation with the 47th (Lancashire) Regiment of Foot to form The Loyal North Lancashire Regiment in 1881. He was then colonel of the 2nd Battalion of the Loyal North Lancs until his death. He was made full general on 1 October 1877. 

He married Eleanor Anne, third daughter of Robert Rickart Hepburn of Rickarton and had two sons and a daughter. He died in 1900.

References

|-

|

1815 births
1900 deaths
British Army generals
General Officers Commanding, Ceylon
81st Regiment of Foot officers
Companions of the Order of the Star of India
British military personnel of the Indian Rebellion of 1857